Tripartite motif-containing protein 6 is a protein that in humans is encoded by the TRIM6 gene.

The protein encoded by this gene is a member of the tripartite motif (TRIM) family. The TRIM motif includes three zinc-binding domains, a RING, a B-box type 1 and a B-box type 2, and a coiled-coil region. 

The protein localizes to the nucleus, but its specific function has not been identified. This gene is mapped to chromosome 11p15, where it resides within a TRIM gene cluster. Two alternatively spliced transcript variants encoding distinct isoforms have been found for this gene. A read-through transcript transcribed from this gene and TRIM34 has been observed.

References

Further reading